Henry Sturgis Dennison (March 4, 1877 – February 29, 1952) was an American progressive business man, president and owner of Dennison Manufacturing Co. Paper Box Factory, economic analyst, and organizational theorist. He was president of the Taylor Society from 1919 to 1921, and recipient of the Henry Laurence Gantt Medal in 1932.

Biography

Youth, education and career 
Born in Boston, Massachusetts, Dennison was the son of Henry Beals Dennison and Emma Stanley Dennison. His grandfather Andrew Dennison was founding president of Dennison Manufacturing Co. Paper Box Factory in 1844, and his father had followed in his footsteps. After regular education Dennison graduating from Harvard College in 1899.

After his graduation Dennison entered the family business in 1899, where he was promoted to work manager in 1906. From 1917 to 1942 he was president of the company, realizing a steady growth of the company.

Other activities, honours and death 
Besides his work at the Dennison Manufacturing Co., Dennison was active member in several organizations, lectured at Harvard Business School, and authored several books and articles.

Dennison participated in the Taylor Society, where he was president from 1919 to 1921 as successor of John E. Otterson. In 1921 he was succeeded by Henry P. Kendall. Dennison also served as director of the American Management Association, and as president of the Boston Chamber of Commerce, the National Resources Planning Board, and the Business Research Council. He was also industrial advisor to the administrations of Woodrow Wilson and Franklin D. Roosevelt.

in 1932 Dennison was awarded the Henry Laurence Gantt Medal by the American Management Association and the ASME, and the Taylor Key Award by the Society for Advancement of Management in 1940.

Dennison died in 1952 in Framingham, Massachusetts.

Work 

Dennison had a specific interest in the theories of scientific management and as president of Dennison Manufacturing Company initiated several reforms in line with those insights. These included "an unemployment fund, a reduction in working hours, non-managerial profit-sharing and the establishment of health and personnel services. "

Publications 
 Henry S. Dennison. E.W. Dennison : a memorial. Boston : Merrymount Press, 1909.
 Burritt, A. W., Dennison, H. S., Gay, E. F., Heilman, R. E., & Kendall, H. P. Profit sharing, its principles and practice: A collaboration. Harper & brothers, 1918.
 Henry S. Dennison. The psychological foundations of management, 1927.
 Henry S. Dennison. Organization engineering. New York: McGraw Hill, 1931.
 Stanley B. Mathewson. With chapters by William M. Leiserson, Henry S. Dennison and Arthur E. Morgan. Restriction of output among unorganized workers, New York : Viking Press, 1931.
 Henry S. Dennison. Ethics and modern business, 1932.	
 Henry S. Dennison , et al. Toward full employment. New York : Whittlesey House, McGraw-Hill, 1938.
 John Kenneth Galbraith & Henry S. Dennison. Modern Competition and Business Policy, 1938.

Articles, a selection
 Dennison, Henry S. "Management and the Business Cycle." Journal of the American Statistical Association 18.137 (1922): 20-32.
 Dennison, Henry S. "The Need for the Development of Political Science Engineering." American Political Science Review 26.02 (1932): 241-255.

Publications about Henry S. Dennison
 James T. Dennison. Henry S. Dennison, 1877-1952: New England industrialist who served America, No. 187. Newcomen Society in North America, 1955.
 Kim McQuaid, "Henry S. Dennison and the" Science" of Industrial Reform, 1900-1950." American Journal of Economics and Sociology (1977): 79-98.
 Kyle Bruce, "Henry S. Dennison, Elton Mayo, and Human Relations historiography." Management & Organizational History 2006, 1: 177–199.

References

External links 

 Henry S. Dennison Papers, 1900-1971 at Harvard University

1877 births
1952 deaths
Engineers from Massachusetts
People from Boston
Henry Laurence Gantt Medal recipients
Harvard College alumni